Phyllodytes praeceptor is a species of frog in the family Hylidae endemic to coastal areas in the state of Bahia in Brazil.  It has also been seen in Serra da Jiboia, 694 m above sea level.

The adult male frog measures 20.7-25.8 mm in snout-vent length.  This frog has prominent eyes.

References

Endemic fauna of Brazil
Amphibians described in 2018
Frogs of South America